Las víctimas is a Mexican telenovela produced by Televisa for Telesistema Mexicano in 1967.

Cast 
Sergio Bustamante
Alejandro Ciangherotti
Lorenzo de Rodas
José Carlos Ruiz
Olga Morris

References

External links 

Mexican telenovelas
1967 telenovelas
Televisa telenovelas
Spanish-language telenovelas
1967 Mexican television series debuts
1967 Mexican television series endings